Huella is a 1940 Argentine film directed by Luis Moglia Barth.

Cast
 Enrique Muiño…Mariano Funes		
 Fernando Ochoa		
 Malisa Zini …Merceditas Ruiz		
 Daniel Belluscio …Goyo		
 Emilio Gola		
 Ada Cornaro		
 José Otal
 Orestes Caviglia…Nazareno Miranda		
 Pablo Cumo
 Percival Murray
 Héctor Méndez		
 Eduardo Otero		
 Froilán Varela

References

External links
 

1940 films
1940s Spanish-language films
Argentine black-and-white films
1940 drama films
Films directed by Luis Moglia Barth
Argentine drama films
1940s Argentine films